Victor Wagner Pedersen (born March 18, 1996) is a Danish footballer who currently plays for Varde IF.

Career

Youth career
Wagner started his career in Esbjerg fB, but in 2014 he went to Wolverhampton F.C. on a one-year youth contract, with an option for a further year.

FC Vestsjælland
On July 6, 2015, Wagner signed a two-year contract with FC Vestsjælland. He got his league debut for the club on July 25, against Silkeborg IF.

On August 11, he scored his first goal for FCV, in a game in the Danish Cup against Frem Sakskøbing.

Thisted FC
On 7 February 2016 it was confirmed, that Wagner had signed for Thisted FC.

Næstved BK
Wagner signed with Danish 1st Division club Næstved BK on 31 January 2019.

Return to Varde IF
In the summer 2021, Wagner returned to his former club Varde IF in the Denmark Series.

References

External links
 
 

1996 births
Living people
Danish men's footballers
Danish expatriate men's footballers
Association football defenders
Danish 1st Division players
Danish 2nd Division players
Norwegian Second Division players
FC Vestsjælland players
Thisted FC players
Nybergsund IL players
Næstved Boldklub players
Brattvåg IL players
BK Avarta players
Danish expatriate sportspeople in England
Danish expatriate sportspeople in Norway
Expatriate footballers in England
Expatriate footballers in Norway